Der Kuhreigen  ("The Cow Round") is an opera or musical play in three acts by the Austrian composer Wilhelm Kienzl. The libretto, by Richard Batka, is after Rudolf Hans Bartsch's novel Die kleine Blanchefleur. It was first performed at the Volksoper in Vienna on 23 November 1911.

Roles

Synopsis
Set in revolutionary France, this is the love story of the Swiss Sergeant Primus Thaller, condemned for singing the banned Swiss 'Kuhreigen' folksong, and Blanchefleur, wife of the Marquis Massimelle, who saves him and then herself becomes a victim of the revolution.

Recordings

March 27, 1952, Conductor: Wilhelm Loibner; Walter Berry, Otto Wiener, Anny Felbermayer, Leo Heppe, Dagmar Hermann, Fritz Sperlbauer, Erich Kaufmann, Josef Knapp, and Ruthilde Boesch. Tonkünstlerchor und Großes Orchester der RAVAG, Wien, 1951. MYTO Historical Line 2CD 00275

Richard Tauber, who was a favorite of the composer, recorded the two main tenor arias twice for Odeon Records, firstly in April 1920 by the acoustic process, and again in September 1931 electrically. Both are now on CD.

Sources

Melitz: Führer durch die Opern” (Berlin 1920), translated by Andreas Praefcke

External links
Page at Andreas-Praefcke.de, accessed 16 June 2009

Operas by Wilhelm Kienzl
1911 operas
Operas set in France
German-language operas
Operas
Operas based on novels
Operas set in the French Revolution